The 2017–18 UMass Lowell River Hawks men's basketball team represented the University of Massachusetts Lowell during the 2017–18 NCAA Division I men's basketball season. The River Hawks, led by fifth-year head coach Pat Duquette, played most of their home games at Costello Athletic Center, with six home games at the Tsongas Center. They were members of the America East Conference.

The season marked the River Hawks' first full season as a Division I school after a four-year transition period from Division II to Division I. Accordingly, they were eligible for postseason play including the America East tournament. They finished the season 12–18, 6–10 in America East play to finish in a tie for sixth place. They lost in the quarterfinals of the America East tournament to UMBC.

Previous season
The River Hawks finished the 2016–17 season 11–20, 5–11 in American East play to finish in sixth place. UMass Lowell was in the fourth and final year of a transition to Division I and, thus, ineligible for the postseason, including the America East tournament.

Offseason

Departures

Incoming transfers

2017 incoming recruits

2018 incoming recruits

Preseason 
In a poll by the conference’s nine head coaches (who were not allowed to pick their own team) at the America East media day, the River Hawks were picked to finish in a tied for sixth place in the America East. Senior Jahad Thomas, Sr. was named to the preseason All-America East team.

Roster

Schedule and results

|-
!colspan=9 style=| Non-conference regular season

|-
!colspan=9 style=| America East regular season

|-
!colspan=9 style=| America East tournament

Source

References

UMass Lowell River Hawks men's basketball seasons
UMass Lowell
UMass Lowell River Hawks men's basketball
UMass Lowell River Hawks men's basketball